Leptolalax sungi (Sung toad or Sang's metacarpal-tubercled toad) is a frog species in the family Megophryidae. It is found in Vĩnh Phúc and Lào Cai Provinces in northern Vietnam and in Guangxi in southern China. Its natural habitats are subtropical moist lowland forests, moist montane forests, and rivers. Its status is insufficiently known. This species was first found along a stream near Tam Đảo village, about 925 meters ASL.

Description
Leptolalax sungi are the largest frogs in the genus Leptolalax: males measure  and females  in snout-vent length. Their back is granular with distinct tubercles but uniform in colour or with light spots. The sides have small dark spots. They have iridescent gold-green irises.

References

sungi
Amphibians of China
Amphibians of Vietnam
Amphibians described in 1998
Taxonomy articles created by Polbot
Taxobox binomials not recognized by IUCN